Ruben Cloete (born 3 November 1982) is a South African soccer player who played as a defender. He played for Santos, Free State Stars, Orlando Pirates, Maritzburg United, Bloemfontein Celtic, Chippa United and the South Africa national team.

External links

1982 births
Living people
People from Upington
South African soccer players
Association football defenders
Association football midfielders
Orlando Pirates F.C. players
Santos F.C. (South Africa) players
Free State Stars F.C. players
Maritzburg United F.C. players
Bloemfontein Celtic F.C. players
Chippa United F.C. players
South African Premier Division players
South Africa international soccer players